The Schleicher Ka-4 Rhönlerche II, sometimes called the KA-4 or even K 4, is a West German high-wing, strut-braced, two-seat glider that was designed by Rudolf Kaiser and produced by Alexander Schleicher GmbH & Co.

Design and development
The Rhönlerche II was first flown 7 December 1953. Its design goals were to produce a simple, inexpensive and robust two-seat trainer for school and club use. The design was a success and several hundred were constructed.

The Rhönlerche II is constructed with a welded steel tube fuselage and a wooden wing and tail surfaces, all finished in doped aircraft fabric covering. The  span wing is supported by single lift struts and employs a Goettingen 533 airfoil. The aircraft's landing gear is a fixed monowheel, with a nose skid.

The aircraft was issued a US type certificate on 28 September 1960.

Operational history
The Ka-4 was widely used by clubs and schools in West Germany and also by Canadian military gliding clubs stationed in West Germany, including the Lahr Gliding Club at CFB Lahr. One of these aircraft was later shipped to Canada and operated by the Cold Lake Gliding Club at CFB Cold Lake and in July 2011 was owned by the Gravelbourg Gliding And Soaring Club, Gravelbourg, Saskatchewan.

In July 2011 there were still five Ka-4s on the United States Federal Aviation Administration aircraft registry.

Aircraft on display

Aviodrome - 3
Technikmuseum Speyer
US Southwest Soaring Museum - 2
Austrian Aviation Museum

Specifications (Ka-4)

See also

Notes

References

External links

1950s German sailplanes
Schleicher aircraft
High-wing aircraft
Aircraft first flown in 1953